Carex laxiculmis, the creeping sedge, is a species of flowering plant in the family Cyperaceae, native to Ontario, Canada, and the central and eastern United States. As with most species of sedge, it prefers to grow in shady, wet areas. Its cultivar 'Hobb', sold under the trade designation , is available from commercial nurseries.

Subtaxa
The following varieties are currently accepted:
Carex laxiculmis var. copulata (L.H.Bailey) Fernald – central part of range, and Minnesota, and introduced to New York
Carex laxiculmis var. laxiculmis – entire range, except Minnesota

References

laxiculmis
Flora of Ontario
Flora of Minnesota
Flora of Iowa
Flora of Missouri
Flora of Wisconsin
Flora of Illinois
Flora of the Northeastern United States
Flora of Arkansas
Flora of Kentucky
Flora of Tennessee
Flora of Alabama
Flora of Delaware
Flora of Maryland
Flora of Washington, D.C.
Flora of Virginia
Flora of Georgia (U.S. state)
Flora of North Carolina
Flora of South Carolina
Plants described in 1824
Flora without expected TNC conservation status